Newton's sunbird, or the São Tomé sunbird (Anabathmis newtonii) is a species of bird in the family Nectariniidae. It is endemic to São Tomé Island. It is one of the smallest sunbirds. In general, the bird has dark olive upperparts - the male has an iridescent green-purple throat and upper breast region, while females have a dull olive throat and yellowish underparts, but underparts in female youth do not develop into yellow until later sexual maturity.

References

External links

Newton's sunbird
Endemic birds of São Tomé and Príncipe
Endemic fauna of São Tomé Island
Newton's sunbird
Taxonomy articles created by Polbot